Presidential elections were held in Lithuania on 12 May 2019, with a second round held on 26 May 2019. Due to a constitutional limit of two terms in office, incumbent president Dalia Grybauskaitė was unable to run, having won the 2009 and 2014 elections.

As no candidate obtained 50% of the vote in the first round, a second round was held between the top two candidates, Ingrida Šimonytė and Gitanas Nausėda. Nausėda was elected with 67% of the vote and was inaugurated as President of Lithuania on 12 July.

Electoral system
The elections were held using the two-round system. To win in the first round, a candidate required an absolute majority of the vote and either voter turnout to be above 50% or for their vote share to be equivalent to at least one-third of the number of registered voters. If no candidate wins in the first round, a second round is required, featuring the top two candidates.

Candidates

Approved candidates
Naglis Puteikis, MP, Chairman of the Lithuanian Centre Party.
Valentinas Mazuronis, MEP, former Minister of Environment. Independent.
Gitanas Nausėda, economist, lecturer. Independent.
Arvydas Juozaitis, philosopher, former Olympic athlete. Independent.
Ingrida Šimonytė, MP, former deputy chairwoman of the Board of the Bank of Lithuania (2013–2016), former Minister of Finance (2009–2012). Independent, nominated by the Homeland Union.
Vytenis Andriukaitis, Lithuania's European Commissioner, former Minister of Health (2012–2014), and a co-signatory to the 1990 Act of the Re-Establishment of the State of Lithuania. Nominated by the Social Democratic Party of Lithuania.
Saulius Skvernelis, Prime Minister since 2016, former Minister of Interior (2014–2016)  Independent, nominated by the Lithuanian Farmers and Greens Union and the Social Democratic Labour Party of Lithuania.
Mindaugas Puidokas, MP. Independent.
Valdemar Tomaševski, MEP, Chairman of Electoral Action of Poles in Lithuania.

Declined candidates
Žygimantas Pavilionis, MP, former Ambassador of Lithuania to the United States
Vygaudas Ušackas, former EU Ambassador to Russia. Lost TS-LKD primaries.
Aušra Maldeikienė, MP
Visvaldas Matijošaitis, Mayor of Kaunas
Vitas Gudiškis, former President of Ice Hockey Federation of Lithuania
Petras Auštrevičius, MEP
Kazimieras Juraitis,
Petras Gražulis, MP

Opinion polls

First round

Results
The first round was narrowly won by former Finance Minister Ingrida Šimonytė, with  economist Gitanas Nausėda finishing second. As neither candidate passed the threshold of 50% of votes cast, a run-off was be held between Šimonytė and Nausėda on 26 May. Nausėda won the second round with over 66% of the vote.

After finishing a distant third, Prime Minister Saulius Skvernelis announced his intention to resign on election night, with his resignation coming into effect on 12 July. Later, it was revealed that Skvernelis will continue his tenure as the Prime Minister until the next election of the Parliament.

References

Lithuania
Presidential
Lithuania
Presidential elections in Lithuania